Marshalls is an American chain of off-price department stores owned by TJX Companies. Marshalls has over 1,000 American stores, including larger stores named Marshalls Mega Store, covering 42 states and Puerto Rico, and 61 stores in Canada. Marshalls first expanded into Canada in March 2011.

Marshalls is one of the largest U.S. off-price family apparel and home fashion retailers, along with its sister company, TJ Maxx. Its slogans are Your Surprise Is Waiting and Never Boring, Always Surprising.

History
Marshalls traces its history to 1956, when Alfred Marshall gathered a band of innovative entrepreneurs on the East Coast, including Bernard Goldston, Norman Barren, and Irving Blitt (Frank Estey and Bernard Ribas joined the entrepreneurs in 1960 by purchasing Bernard Goldston's shares), to collectively start up the "Brand Names For Less" concept. Marshalls did not carry clothing until Irving Blitt (who later handled the sporting goods concession) called his friend Al Marshall letting him know he had the opportunity to purchase factory second Arrow shirts while on a trip to New York.

Contemplating the dual postwar phenomena of a boom in the economy and growth in the suburbs, Marshall and associates came upon a way to meet it profitably. Together, they opened a self-service department store in Beverly, Massachusetts, offering apparel and homewares at alluringly low prices. Additional floor space was "sublet" to offer customers shoes, hardware, and sporting goods from separate sellers, but the separate ownership of those departments was invisible to the shopper. The original store also had a soda fountain/grill, which was another sublet of floor space, the "A & M Luncheonette" (for Alice & Mickey Masters, the proprietors).

The concept proved extremely successful. Ten years later, Marshalls had become the leading off-price retail chain in the nation. Given the volatility of the American economy in the 1970s, with recession affecting the spending habits of most shoppers, the off-price industry gathered speed. By buying up manufacturers' post-season, overrun, and close-out stock, Marshalls was able to offer fashionable, high-quality "designer" items at prices 20 to 60 percent less than those of the department stores.

In 1976, Marshalls was acquired by Melville Corporation. By 1993, Marshalls had expanded throughout 42 states including Hawaii, and had opened several downtown locations. In 1995, Marshalls was purchased by TJX, the parent company of its main rival, TJ Maxx, for $550 million.

Marshalls and T.J. Maxx operate as sister stores, and share a similar footprint throughout the country. While the two offer near-identical prices and have similar store layouts, Marshalls differentiates itself by featuring a larger emphasis on family footwear and larger men's and juniors departments.

In 2019, Marshalls began operating a website for online shopping.

Legal troubles
TJX paid US$100 million settlement in California to settle an employee class-action suit in 2002, which alleged that Marshalls abused exempt/nonexempt classifications to avoid the payment of overtime or compensation time to employees in certain roles performing non-exempt job duties, as required by the federal Fair Labor Standards Act.

Charity
The enterprise has developed national and local partnerships with U.S. charitable organizations. All donations and fund-raising efforts from Marshalls are connected to helping children, families, and their communities with these programs:
Domestic Violence Prevention
Juvenile Diabetes Research Foundation
National Youth Anti-Drug Campaign
St. Jude Children's Research Hospital
United Way

Marshalls Canada
Marshalls opened its first locations in Canada in March 2011. As of November 2016, Marshalls Canada had 50 stores with plans to operate approximately 100 stores across the country.

See also
H&M
Ross Stores

References

External links

 

TJX Companies
American companies established in 1956
Retail companies established in 1956
Clothing retailers of the United States
Clothing retailers of Canada
Discount stores of Canada
Discount stores of the United States
Department stores of Canada
Companies based in Framingham, Massachusetts
1956 establishments in Massachusetts
1976 mergers and acquisitions
1995 mergers and acquisitions